Pedro Aguayo Cubillo (born 15 July 1939 in Guayaquil) served as Vice President of Ecuador from 2 April 1998 to 10 August 1998, the last four months of presidency of Fabián Alarcón. He was elected by National Congress to replace Rosalía Arteaga upon her resignation. 
Before his election Aguayo was the Ecuadorian representative in the 
Inter-American Development Bank.
He continues to receive a lifetime pension from the Ecuadorian government of $ 28,000 annually.

References 

Vice presidents of Ecuador
Living people
1939 births